Olbia is a city and commune of 60,346 inhabitants (May 2018) in the Italian insular province of Sassari in northeastern Sardinia, Italy, in the historical region of Gallura. Called  in the Roman age, Civita in the Middle Ages (Judicates period) and the Terranova Pausania until the 1940s, Olbia has again been the official name of the city since the fascist period.

Geography 
It is the economic centre of this part of the island (commercial centres, food industry) and is very close to the  Costa Smeralda tourist area. It was one of the administrative capitals of the province of Olbia-Tempio, operative since 2005 and canceled after a referendum seven years later. Olbia is a tourist destination thanks to its sea and beaches and also for the large number of places of cultural interest to visit.

Climate 
Olbia has a Mediterranean climate (Csa), with mild winters, warm springs and autumns and hot summers.

History 
Although the name is of Greek origin, due to the Greek presence during the seventh century B.C., the city of Olbia was first settled either by the Nuragics or by Phoenicians, according to the archaeological findings. It contains ruins from the Nuragic era to the Roman era, when it was an important port, and the Middle Ages, when it was the capital of the Giudicato of Gallura, one of the four independent states of Sardinia. During the First Punic War, the Romans fought against the Carthaginians and the Sardinians near Olbia, where the general Hanno died in battle.
 
From 1113 it was the episcopal see of the Diocese of Cività (succeeding to the Diocese of Gallura, the 1070 restoration of the Diocese of Fausania,  500–750), which was renamed in 1839 as Diocese of Civita–Tempio until its formal suppression in favor of (in fact merger into) the Diocese of Tempio–Ampurias (also integrating the Diocese of Ampurias, which was in personal union with the see of Civita from 1506).

Main sights 
 Romanesque former cathedral of San Simplicio (11th–12th century).
 Church of St. Paul Apostle (medieval)
 National Archaeology Museum
 Pedres Castle
Several dolmens and a menhir
Several nuraghes
Remains of the Roman forum and aqueduct
Remains of Carthaginian walls
Fausto Noce park, the largest in Sardinia
River park of Padrongianus

Sport
Olbia Calcio 1905 represents Olbia in Serie C, the third division of Italian football.
Olbia hosted several legs of Aquabike World Championship (powerboating) in 2003, 2004, 2018, 2019.

Transport 

Olbia is the main connection between Sardinia and the Italian peninsula, with an airport (Olbia – Costa Smeralda), a passenger port (Olbia-Isola Bianca), and a railway from Olbia railway station to Porto Torres, Golfo Aranci and Cagliari. There is an expressway to Nuoro and Cagliari (SS131) and national roads to Sassari (SS199-E840), Tempio Pausania (SS127) and Palau (SS125).

Local transport 
The internal city public transport and bus connections with the surrounding areas are provided by the ASPO (Olbia's public service company), while vehicle connections with the other centers of the territory are provided by the ARST (Sardinian regional transport company). Other private carriers operate with lines under concession.

Local Hospitals 
The major hospitals in the area are:

 "Giovanni Paolo II" Hospital - Olbia
 "Paolo Dettori" Hospital - Tempio Pausania
 "Paolo Merlo" Hospital - La Maddalena
 Mater Olbia Hospital - Olbia

Gallery

References

Sources and external links 

 
 City of Olbia
 GCatholic

 
Cities and towns in Sardinia
Phoenician colonies in Sardinia